Giovanni Familiare Capitello (born August 27, 1979, in Brooklyn, New York) is an American actor / filmmaker.

Background
Capitello is of Sicilian and German descent and was born in Brooklyn (1979) and raised in East Patchogue, New York. He attended Bellport High School (1994–1997).

Career
He started studying acting at The School for Film and Television in New York City (now known as The New York Conservatory for Dramatic Arts) where he learned the Sanford Meisner technique. After acting school he appeared in many independent films and in a major motion picture, Keeping the Faith (2000). Giovanni later studied filmmaking and acquired a filmmaking and multimedia degree. Early on Giovanni worked on a documentary based on the birth of the hip-hop and graffiti culture, Hip-Hop Diaries (2006), that aired on a major television network in Europe (Sky TV, 2006). Giovanni directed a thriller/suspense film in the town he grew up in, Patchogue, titled Hanging Tree (2011). Other works include: The Elevator Game (2015),  Warning Label (2014), Say Something (2015) and television pilot Girls Night Out (2007). Giovanni founded his own video production/media company, Magic Mind Media.

Filmography (Actor)

Filmography (Director)

References

Magic Mind Media
Sundays in the City Film Festival

External links

Giovanni Capitello official actor website
Giovanni Capitello official filmmaker website
IFILM Link to PLAYLIST

1979 births
American music video directors
American television directors
American male film actors
American male television actors
American film editors
American animated film directors
American animated film producers
Film producers from New York (state)
American male screenwriters
Animators from New York (state)
People from East Patchogue, New York
Living people
Male actors from New York City
American people of German descent
American writers of Italian descent
People from Brooklyn
Artists from New York City
20th-century American artists
21st-century American artists
Film directors from New York City
Screenwriters from New York (state)
American people of Italian descent